Encarnação is a station on the Red Line of the Lisbon Metro. The station is located under Rua General Silva Freire in the parish of Encarnação, a densely populated residential neighbourhood of northern Lisbon.

The station, designed by the architect Alberto Barradas, opened on 17 July 2012 in conjunction with the Moscavide and Aeroporto stations, as part of the expansion of the line to serve Lisbon Portela Airport.

Connections

Urban buses

Carris 
 705 Estação Oriente (Interface) ⇄ Estação Roma-Areeiro
 722 Praça de Londres ⇄ Portela - Rua dos Escritores
 725 Estação Oriente (Interface) ⇄ Prior Velho - Rua Maestro Lopes Graça
 759 Restauradores ⇄ Estação Oriente (Interface)
 779 Centro Comercial dos Olivais - circulação
 781 Cais do Sodré ⇄ Prior Velho

See also
 List of Lisbon metro stations

References

External links

Red Line (Lisbon Metro) stations
Railway stations opened in 2012